Arkoe is a village in Nodaway County, Missouri, United States. The population was 68 at the 2010 census.

Geography
Arkoe is located at  (40.259248, -94.827502).

Etymology
The United States Board on Geographic Names in its Geographic Names Information System only lists two Arkoes in the United States (the other being in Pike County, Ohio).

One of the earliest uses of the name was in the 18th-century fantasy book  "The Life and Adventures of Peter Wilkins" by Robert Paltock which was published in 1751 which said an Arkoe is a "water surrounded with wood."  The story is about a sailor named Peter Wilkins who is shipwrecked on a mysterious island inhabited by flying people called "Glaws" who inhabit the Arkoes. The book is a mix of adventure, romance, and social commentary, and is considered to be an early example of science fiction.

The book was adopted by humorist Gilbert Abbott à Beckett in 1846 into a London play entitled "Peter Wilkins : Or, the loadstone rock and the flying Indians" (although Arkoe is not mentioned in the play)

It was also adapted in 1923 in a book "Peter Wilkins: Or, Harlequin Harlokin and the Flying Islanders" by George Thorne."

The exact reason the community was named Arkoe is not specifically known. Arkoe adjoins the  One Hundred and Two River and that is sometimes considered the reason for the name.

An 1882 history of Nodaway County incorrectly stated that the inspiration was mentioned in the Jules Verne novel Twenty Thousand Leagues Under the Seas  However, the name is not mentioned in the book.

History
The first community in the Arkoe immediate area was Bridgewater which was about a mile north of the current Arkoe. Nodaway County's first railroad (starting out as the Missouri Valley Railroad before becoming the Kansas City, St. Joseph and Council Bluffs Railroad and ultimately becoming part of the Burlington Northern route) built two bridges across the 102 river within 1,000 feet of each on an elbow bend in the river and the county built a road bridge between the two in the same location. The railroad plotted the community of Bridgewater by the bridges in 1870 and the post office opened there. Dr. Paul H. Talbott who granted the right of way through much of the land in the area insisted that the town site be located on his property and on September 16, 1874, he and S.K. Snively laid out Arkoe. Nelson Wilson who had opened a merchandise store in Bridgewater in 1871 moved the building to Arkoe and became its first business in 1874. Other businesses followed including the railroad which moved its depot from Bridgewater to Arkoe. 

On September 18, 1880, Dr. Talbott was shot and killed at his home. His wife, Belle, and his sons Charles Edward and Albert Perry were initially suspected and arrested for his murder. Eventually, Belle was released and the sons were tried for their father's murder. Both were convicted and sentenced to hang. They were executed in the Beal Pasture (today Beal Park), on the east side of Maryville, on July 22, 1881. News accounts estimated the number of people present at the hanging at over 10,000. The Talbott brothers' hanging is said to have been the first "legal" hanging in Nodaway County. The Talbott brothers are buried in a private family cemetery a half mile west of Arkoe. Dr. Talbbot and his sons are buried in the private Talbott cemetery plot near Arkoe. The tombstone for the sons says "We Died Innocent."

Arkoe formally incorporated in 1906.

The Arkoe post office closed in 1953.

The Arkoe rail line closed by 1979.

Demographics

2010 census
As of the census of 2010, there were 68 people, 23 households, and 16 families living in the village. The racial makeup of the village was 100.0% White.

There were 23 households, of which 52.2% had children under the age of 18 living with them, 56.5% were married couples living together, 8.7% had a female householder with no husband present, 4.3% had a male householder with no wife present, and 30.4% were non-families. 26.1% of all households were made up of individuals, and 17.3% had someone living alone who was 65 years of age or older. The average household size was 2.96 and the average family size was 3.50.

The median age in the village was 31.5 years. 39.7% of residents were under the age of 18; 2.9% were between the ages of 18 and 24; 26.5% were from 25 to 44; 23.6% were from 45 to 64; and 7.4% were 65 years of age or older. The gender makeup of the village was 50.0% male and 50.0% female.

2000 census
As of the census of 2000, there were 58 people, 24 households, and 13 families living in the town. The racial makeup of the town was 96.55% White, and 3.45% from two or more races.

There were 24 households, out of which 33.3% had children under the age of 18 living with them, 45.8% were married couples living together, 4.2% had a female householder with no husband present, and 41.7% were non-families. 33.3% of all households were made up of individuals, and 16.7% had someone living alone who was 65 years of age or older. The average household size was 2.42 and the average family size was 3.21.

In the town the population was spread out, with 27.6% under the age of 18, 5.2% from 18 to 24, 34.5% from 25 to 44, 17.2% from 45 to 64, and 15.5% who were 65 years of age or older. The median age was 38 years. For every 100 females, there were 152.2 males. For every 100 females age 18 and over, there were 147.1 males.

The median income for a household in the town was $40,000, and the median income for a family was $51,250. Males had a median income of $27,500 versus $21,250 for females. The per capita income for the town was $13,725. There were 14.3% of families and 14.3% of the population living below the poverty line, including 23.5% of under eighteens and none of those over 64.

References

External links
 History of Arkoe

Villages in Nodaway County, Missouri
Villages in Missouri